Oxford Hotel is a historic hotel located in Oxford, Chester County, Pennsylvania. It is a four-story, brick structure in the Italianate style. The original hotel was built in 1853, and was a three-story, brick "L"-shaped structure with a steeply pitched gable roof. The building was later enlarged and modified in 1888, 1894, and 1924. The building has been converted to apartments.

It was added to the National Register of Historic Places in 1994.  It is located in the Oxford Historic District.

References

Hotel buildings on the National Register of Historic Places in Pennsylvania
Italianate architecture in Pennsylvania
Hotel buildings completed in 1853
Buildings and structures in Chester County, Pennsylvania
National Register of Historic Places in Chester County, Pennsylvania
Individually listed contributing properties to historic districts on the National Register in Pennsylvania